Awards of Olympic Committee of Serbia are proclaimed since 1994, at the end of each calendar year, to the most successful athletes. From 1994 to 2003 name was FR Yugoslavia and from 2003 to 2006 Serbia and Montenegro. Initially declared sportswoman and sportsman, and later introduced the award for best the women's  team, the men's team, coach and young sportsperson. The competition includes results from current Olympic sports, also and from Chess Olympiad. Trophies are traditionally awarded at a gala evening at the House of the National Assembly.

Criteria for Awards
Awards are given to the athletes and teams according to their results in Olympic sports, Paralympic sports and from Chess Olympiad. The most valuable results are those accomplished in these competitions (in this order):

1. Olympic Games
2. World Championship
3. European Championship
4. World Cup
5. European Cup
6. Paralympic Games
7. Chess Olympiad

The award for most successful coach can be awarded to a coach who was a member of one of the Serbian national teams which achieved the most valuable sporting result according to listed criteria.
If two sportspersons have identical results, the award will go to athletes from individual sports instead of team sports. An exception can be made if an athlete from a team sport won an MVP award at the Olympic Games, World Championship or European Championship. Also, the worldwide popularity of their sports can be taken into account, as well as the maximum number of athletes from an individual nation that can participate in competitions.
If there are no exceptional results in given year, the award will not be presented.

Sportswoman of The Year

This award is proclaimed since the introduction of awards in 1994. So far it was awarded to 16 different athletes from 10 sports.

Sportsman of The Year

This award is proclaimed since the introduction of awards in 1994. So far it was awarded to 17 different athletes from 10 sports.

Team Sport Athlete of The Year
This award is introduced in 2022. So far it was awarded to 1 different athlete from 1 sport.

Young Athlete of The Year
This award is introduced in 2010. So far it was awarded to 10 different athletes from 8 sports.

Women's Team of The Year

This award is introduced in 1995. It was awarded to 10 different teams from 7 different sports.

Men's Team of The Year

This award is introduced in 1995. It was awarded to 5 different teams from 5 different sports.

Coach of The Year
This award is introduced in 2009. It was awarded to 9 different coaches from 7 different sports.

Olympic Heart "General Đukić"
This award is introduced in 2017 as the Lifetime Achievement Award.

See also
 Serbian Sportspersonality of the Year

References

External links
 Olympic Committee of Serbia: List of Awardees

Sport in Serbia
Serbian sports trophies and awards
Lists of sportspeople
Lists of award winners